Douglas George How (1919–2001) was a Canadian journalist, magazine editor, and author. 

He was born in Winnipeg, Manitoba but after his father's death the family returned to Dorchester, New Brunswick where his mother was born and where Douglas grew up. At the age of 18, he became a reporter for the Moncton Daily Times and in 1940 he joined the Canadian Press service in Halifax, sending dispatches across the country with the dateline "from an East Coast Canadian Port" to suit the censors at the start of World War II. He enlisted with the Cape Breton Highlanders and was posted to Surrey, England in 1942. In 1943, he was reposted to London to work in public relations for the army. Finding this work unrewarding, he rejoined CP as a war correspondent and for the rest of the war, he reported on Canadian troops in England and Europe, following the Canadian push through Italy and Greece. 

He moved to Ottawa when the war ended and served as a reporter in the Parliamentary Press Gallery for CP between 1945 and 1953. He then worked briefly as a freelance writer in Nova Scotia, and between 1955 and 1957, he was the executive assistant to the Nova Scotia Member of Parliament Robert Winters while Winters was federal Minister of Public Works. He then joined the staff of Time magazine, working on assignments in Toronto, Ottawa and New York. In 1959, he accepted a position as managing editor for the Canadian edition of Reader's Digest, which he held for the next decade. 

How is the author of several books, including the regimental history of the 8th Canadian Hussars (1964), Canada's Mystery Man of High Finance, about Izaak Walton Killam, and KC (co-authored with Ralph Costello), a biography of New Brunswick industrialist K. C. Irving. 

Late in his life, he obtained a long-coveted degree in arts from Mount Allison University. He served as the director of the university extension services for some time before moving to St. Andrews, New Brunswick, where he completed several books. At age 83, he succumbed to heart failure in July 2001.

Publications 
 The 8th Hussars: A History of the Regiment (1964) Maritime Publishing
 The Canadians at War 1939-45 (3 volumes), (1969, editor-in-chief) Montreal: Reader’s Digest
 Canada's Mystery Man of High Finance: the story of Izaak Walton Killam and his glittering wife Dorothy (1986) Hantsport: Lancelot Press.
 Night of the Caribou (1988) Hantsport: Lancelot Press
 K.C. : the biography of K.C. Irving (1993, with Ralph Costello) Toronto: Key Porter Books
 Blow Up the Trumpet in the New Moon (1993) Toronto: Oberon Press
  One Village One War (1995) Hantsport: Lancelot Press

References and further reading
 Douglas How fonds, York University Libraries Clara Thomas Archives and Special Collections
 Douglas How Fonds, New Brunswick Archives

Notes

1919 births
2001 deaths
Canadian newspaper reporters and correspondents
Canadian magazine editors
People from Saint Andrews, New Brunswick